Nsugbe is a town in Anambra East Local Government Area, Anambra State, Nigeria.

Location
It is bordered by Onitsha on the west, Nkwelle-Ezunaka, Umunya to the southwest, Anam to the North. On the east are towns such as Umuleri, Aguleri, Enugwu Aguleri, Nando, Nteje, Awkuzu, Igbariam, and Achalla. Among the villages within Nsugbe includes Agbalagbo, Amumu, Akpalagu and Oguari.

Origin
Oral tradition has it that the first settlers to arrive at Nsugbe were the descendants of Omini son of Enugwu Aguleri Eri who emigrated from Enugwu Aguleri after the death of their father and settled at Okpuno Enugwu Nsugbe, an area on the outskirt of modern Nsugbe. However, Nsugbe the leader of the group was recalled to Aguleri on the death of Enini (Omini) his father. Some of his descendants with his brother Nta remained and were later joined by other immigrants from Ivite Agulu-eri to establish the present-day Enugwu Nsugbe, Offianta Nsugbe, and Abah Nsugbe.

The founders of Nnadi village according to tradition were never part of Nsugbe but a full town of their own the ada war made almost 90% of them flee to Surrounding towns like Nteje Awkuzu, etc. This war ravaged the whole of Igboland and left a lot of places desolate. They settled among the Offinta people until 1903 when they moved back to their original home. 
  The next was the group that came from the Awka-Achalla-Nri axis. They are linked with Amagu village. The next group of settlers came predominantly from the Igbo-speaking parts of Delta state. They lived with the Edo and later crossed the Niger-Anambra flood plains to settle at the eastern bank of the Niger. Some of them settled at Nsugbe forming villages like Agbalagbo, Akpalagu, and Ogwuari.

Some of the immigrants from the mid-west were linked to Eze-Chima who fled Benin in the 15th century. The Founders of Ogwuari came from Ogwuashi-Ukwu in Delta State, a town not so far from Benin. Having crossed the Niger, they settled between the Niger and Anambra rivers with their Anam neighbors for many years, owning farmlands and fishing ponds like Ojeli, Akpatayama, Aribo, and Onono. They eventually crossed the Niger and Anambra Rivers and settled between Ugbo Eke and Akpaka (present-day Onitsha forest reserve) handing over their lands and fishing ponds to Anam people as custodians with an oath to act as caretakers. The last to arrive was the Ogbunike people. They came from Ogbunike, a town in the present-day Oyi local government area of Anambra State. On arrival, they attached themselves to Ogwuari village and have since been completely absorbed.

Nsugbe heart land being fertile was a major recipient of these groups of immigrants and as warriors and hunters those from the mid-west soon occupied an enormous area of land stretching out into other areas. They eventually met the other immigrants at a place called Okuki-izu. This square has since that time been used for purposes of meetings. Therefore, the coming together and the settlement of these immigrants resulted in the foundation of what is today known as Nsugbe Which must have occurred over 500 years ago. Nsugbe in the past can be divided into predynastic and dynastic periods.

The predynastic period marked the time when Nsugbe was a confederation of villages and was governed by three separate groups: the Okala Okwule, the Umuotu, and the Otuogene. The Okala Okwule was a body of elders of the villages that made up Nsugbe while members of the Umuotu were drawn from energetic and able-bodied men in the town. The Otuogene on the other hand comprised a body of old women folk. The dynastic was marked by the period when kingship or monarchical institution was introduced into Nsugbe by the Ogwuari people with the kings being called Obi. The list of Kings: Obi Ezepue, Obi Ezenwigbo, Obi Nwaobi, Obi Eke, Obi Uzoka, Obi Itava, Obi Somukwu, and Obi Ovili (Ofili), overthrown in 1875. Obi Ovili was the last of the Obis to reign. He followed a line of succession, an exclusive preserve of the Umu-Obi family of Ogwuari. His last child was Princess Nno, born in 1875 and died in 1975. This was followed by a period of crises of leadership as a group that called themselves Ndi-Eze emerged.

The word eze is the Igbo word for king. They were therefore a class of multiple kings and were responsible for the overthrow of Obi Ofili. This was the situation when the British colonial administration penetrated Igbo land which ushered in the era of warrant chiefs. Maka was the first to be appointed and he took charge in 1904. He was replaced by Obi Meze while he was still alive in 1924. Obi Meze died in 1935. After the death of Obi Meze, there was a period of interregnum until the Nsugbe people summoned J.N. Anyansi the 1st to rule them in 1946. He was recognized as a second-class chief in 1962 and ruled until he died in 1967. Thereafter Nsugbe entered into another period of crisis as another group called the Oba society emerged. Their main concern was to challenge the multi-eze society. It was also about this period that J.C. Anyansi was appointed as the chief of Nsugbe, currently, Chukwuemeka Osili is chief of Offianta, one of the numerous villages which form Nsugbe.

Modern status
Nsugbe over the years has progressed. Presently  Nsugbe  is the  proposed  administrative station  of Orient petroleum of Anambra state. There is  also Nwafor Orizu University  Of Education. In politics, there are notable politicians including  Senator Alphonsus Igbeke (Ubanese) who was elected  and  sworn in as a Senator of federal republic of Nigeria representing  Anambra North constituency of Anambra State, Nigeria on 25 May 2010 after he displaced Joy Emordi of PDP. Tony Okechukwu Nwoye was declared winner House of Representatives election for Anambra East and West constituency after displacing Peter Madubueze of the All Progressives Grand Alliance in an October 13, 2015 tribunal ruling. Also worthy of mention are  Honorable Barrister Hycinth Aniegboka Nweke and Hon Nweke Menkiti both of whom have been commissioners in Anambra. In the civil service, Ajulu and now Dr. Dan Ezeanwu  have both climbed the pinnacle of  permanent secretaries in Anambra state. In the Area of sports, Nsugbe has produced illustrious sons in the name of late Okechukwu Isima and Obinna Nsofor who have made their mark in the national team, the Super eagles of Nigeria. Monastic presence of our lady of Angels of the Cistercian community is also at Nsugbe.

Charles Beluchi Dibua, the author Ndi Nsugbe in Diaspora  is  presently using the social media to  raise consciousness  and mobilize  Umu Nsugbe together on Facebook  to socialize and at same time  discuss challenges  facing  Ndi Nsugbe.

References

 Ogbumuo E, N, in his B.A History thesis Monarchy In Nsugbe, University Of Lagos, 1982 page 9, quotes Isichei, E's History Of Igbo People, Macmillan Press, London 1977.
 Original story Written by Hyacinth C. Meze: B.A (Hons) History, Diploma 1 Advertising and Postgraduate Certificate Corporate Communication and Public Affairs

Populated places in Anambra State